Word of Honor is a 1981 television film co-written by David Ackles and I.C. Rapoport. It first aired on 6 January 1981 starred Karl Malden and featured appearances by a young Ron Silver and the film debut of John Malkovich.  It was directed by Mel Damski.  This film was produced by Alex Karras and his wife Susan Clark. Karras often makes cameo appearances in films he produces; in this film he appeared as Penniman Butcher (uncredited).  Much of this film was shot in Michigan in places such as Plymouth, where the opening beauty-pageant scene was shot. The newsroom shots were filmed at The Daily Tribune offices in Royal Oak and the real-life editors and reporters were used as extras. Residential shots, including the main characters' home, was shot in the Seminole Hills subdivision of Pontiac.

Synopsis
A reporter refuses to reveal his source in the case of the murder of a young girl. As a result, he and his family are shunned by the residents of the small town in which they live. Virtually no one comes to his daughter's wedding, and at his office, the police search his desk, his boss threatens to fire him, the judge holds him in contempt and throws him in jail. At the last minute the source agrees to testify.

Cast
 Karl Malden ...  Mike McNeill
 Rue McClanahan ...  Maggie McNeill
 Ron Silver ...  David Lerner
 Largo Woodruff ...  Amy
 Alexa Kenin ...  Beverly
 Jacqueline Brookes ...  Spinner
 Jeffrey DeMunn ...  Dist. Atty. Burke (as Jeff DeMunn)
 Henderson Forsythe ...  Peterson
 John Marley ...  Gordon Agee
 Council Cargle
 Dan Lounsbery
 John Malkovich ...  Gary
 Betsy Baker ...  Denise McNeil

Production crew
 Produced by Susan Clark ....  executive producer
 John C. Dutton ....  producer
 Alex Karras ....  executive producer
 G. Chevalier Kevorkian ....  associate producer
 Original Music by Bruce Langhorne
 Cinematography by Jules Brenner
 Film Editing by John Farrell
 Casting by Nancy E. Kelley   (as Nancy Kelley)
 Set Decoration by Gary Papierski

References

External links

1981 television films
1981 films
1980s mystery drama films
American mystery drama films
1980s English-language films
CBS network films
Films directed by Mel Damski
Films scored by Bruce Langhorne
1980s American films